Brigadier I. K. Amoah was a Ghanaian military personnel and a former Chief of Army Staff of the Ghana Army. He served as Chief of Army Staff from November 1979 – December 1981.

References

Ghanaian military personnel
Chiefs of Army Staff (Ghana)